Vanderson Stolk Francisco or simply Vanderson (born February 26, 1987 in Florianópolis), is a Brazilian left back. He currently plays for Guarani de Palhoça.

He made professional debut for Figueirense in a 1-3 away defeat against Vasco in the Campeonato Brasileiro on August 25, 2006.

Contract
4 September 2006 to 31 December 2008

External links
 Guardian Stats Centre
 sambafoot
 zerozero.pt
 CBF
 figueirense.com

1987 births
Living people
Brazilian footballers
Figueirense FC players
Guaratinguetá Futebol players
Brazilian people of German descent
Association football defenders
Sportspeople from Florianópolis